This is a list of state prisons in New Jersey. It does not include federal prisons or county jails located in the State of New Jersey. These facilities are operated by the New Jersey Department of Corrections.

Open
Bayside State Prison (Leesburg)
East Jersey State Prison (Rahway)
Edna Mahan Correctional Facility for Women (Clinton)
Garden State Youth Correctional Facility (Yardville)
Mid-State Correctional Facility (Wrightstown)
New Jersey State Prison (Trenton)
Northern State Prison (Newark)
South Woods State Prison (Bridgeton)

Defunct
Albert C. Wagner Youth Correctional Facility (Bordentown)
Burlington County Prison
Central Reception and Assignment Facility (Trenton)
Riverfront State Prison (Camden)
Southern State Correctional Facility (Delmont)
William H. Fauver Youth Correctional Facility (Annandale)

References 

New Jersey
 
New Jersey Department of Corrections
Prisons